Before the 1903 Kentucky University Pioneers football team won a Southern championship, the highest claim for a Kentucky college football team was a state title.

State champions

 Central (1892)
 Central (1893)
Kentucky State (1894)
Centre (1896)
Central (1897)
Kentucky State (1898)
Central (1899)
Central & Centre (1900)
Kentucky University (1901)

References

College football-related lists
College football championships